The 1916 South Londonderry by-election was held on 22 May 1916.  The by-election was held due to the resignation  of the incumbent Irish Unionist MP, John Gordon.  It was won by the Irish Unionist candidate Denis Henry (a Catholic).

It was the first by-election to be held in Ireland after the Easter rebellion, and the rebellion had had no discernible impact on the contest.

References

1916 elections in Ireland
1916 elections in the United Kingdom
By-elections to the Parliament of the United Kingdom in County Londonderry constituencies
20th century in County Londonderry